Äijänsuo Arena is an arena in Rauma, Finland. It is primarily used for ice hockey, and is the home arena of Lukko. It opened in 1970 and holds 5400 people. The name of the arena was changed to "Lännen Puhelin Areena" in autumn 2006.
And it changed in year 2007 to DNA Areena, when DNA bought/formed with Lännen Puhelin. Now the name is "Kivikylän areena".
Opening match of the U18 World Championships will be played at Äijänsuo with Finland hosting Sweden.

Indoor arenas in Finland
Indoor ice hockey venues in Finland
Rauma, Finland
Buildings and structures in Satakunta
Sports venues completed in 1970
Lukko